Denis Jacquat (born May 29, 1944 in Thiaucourt-Regniéville, Meurthe-et-Moselle) is a member of the National Assembly of France.  He represents the Moselle department,  and is a member of the Union for a Popular Movement.

References

1944 births
Living people
People from Meurthe-et-Moselle
Union for French Democracy politicians
Republican Party (France) politicians
Liberal Democracy (France) politicians
Union for a Popular Movement politicians
Deputies of the 12th National Assembly of the French Fifth Republic
Deputies of the 13th National Assembly of the French Fifth Republic
Deputies of the 14th National Assembly of the French Fifth Republic